Alejandro Landes Echavarría (born in 1980, São Paulo, Brazil) is a Colombian-Ecuadorian film director, producer, screenwriter, and journalist. He is mainly known for directing Spanish-language films such as Porfirio, a Colombian drama that was based on a true story, and the documentary Cocalero about Evo Morales's successful presidential campaign in Bolivia.

Biography
Landes was born in São Paulo, Brazil to a Colombian mother and Ecuadorian father. Landes received a B.A. in Political Economy from Brown University in 2003.

Prior to becoming a filmmaker, Landes worked as an assistant producer for Oppenheimer Presenta, a weekly news broadcast show. He also wrote for the Miami Herald.

Alejandro's first film, Cocalero, premiered at the 2007 Sundance Film Festival. His second feature, Porfirio, premiered in the Quinzaine des Réalisateurs at the 2011 Cannes Film Festival.

In 2015 the work on his home, which he named "Casa Bahia", in Miami, Florida was finished. He contributed his own ideas to the building's architectural design.

Filmography
 Monos (2019)
 Porfirio (2011)
 Cocalero (2007)

References

External links
 
 Cannes 2011 interview with Alejandro Landes

Living people
Hispanic and Latino American film directors
1980 births
Sundance Film Festival award winners